Marginella glabella  is a species of colorful small sea snail, a marine gastropod in the family Marginellidae, the margin shells.

Description
The length of the shell attains 18 mm.

Distribution
This species is found in Northwest Africa, including Cape Verde (doubtful), Mauritania, Senegal and European waters, including the Canary Islands.

References

 Rolán E., 2005. Malacological Fauna From The Cape Verde Archipelago. Part 1, Polyplacophora and Gastropoda.
 Cossignani T. (2006). Marginellidae & Cystiscidae of the World. L'Informatore Piceno. 408pp.
 Boyer F. (2015). Révision des marginelles de Linné (Mollusques prosobranches : Marginellidae et Cystiscidae). Xenophora Taxonomy. 8: 33-55

External links
 Linnaeus, C. (1758). Systema Naturae per regna tria naturae, secundum classes, ordines, genera, species, cum characteribus, differentiis, synonymis, locis. Editio decima, reformata [10th revised edition, vol. 1: 824 pp. Laurentius Salvius: Holmiae]
 Dautzenberg P. (1910). Contribution à la faune malacologique de l'Afrique occidentale. Actes de la Société Linnéenne de Bordeaux. 64: 47-228, pls 1-4 
 Petit de la Saussaye S. (1851). Notice sur le genre Marginelle, Marginella, Lamarck, suivie d'un catalogue synonymique des espèces de ce genre. Journal de Conchyliologie. 2: 38-59
 Maltzan, H. von. (1880). Eine neue Molluskengattung. Nachrichtsblatt der deutschen malakozoologischen Gesellschaft. 12: 106-109
 Katsanevakis, S.; Bogucarskis, K.; Gatto, F.; Vandekerkhove, J.; Deriu, I.; Cardoso A.S. (2012). Building the European Alien Species Information Network (EASIN): a novel approach for the exploration of distributed alien species data. BioInvasions Records. 1: 235-245

glabella
Gastropods described in 1758
Taxa named by Carl Linnaeus
Molluscs of the Atlantic Ocean
Molluscs of the Mediterranean Sea
Molluscs of the Canary Islands
Gastropods of Cape Verde